Stella Maud Court Treatt, FRGS (née Hinds; 1895 – 1976) was a South African filmmaker, author, and adventurer who with her first husband Chaplin Court Treatt undertook the Court Treatt Expedition 1924–1926, the first successful attempt to drive a motor car from Cape Town to Cairo.

Early and personal life
Stella Maud Hinds was born in Blaauwbank, the South African Republic, on March 11, 1895.  She was the daughter of Alice Maud Jennings and Thomas Charles Hinds, a burgher of the Zuid-Afrikaansche Republiek with a farm near Magaliesburg.  Stella's sister, (Hilda) Grace Hinds, was the mother of John Cranko, the South African ballet dancer and choreographer.  Grace's husband, Herbert Cranko, helped to raise money and secure permissions for Stella's subsequent expedition with Chaplin Court Treatt from the Cape to Cairo.

In 1923, Stella married Major Chaplin Court Treatt, a Royal Flying Corps officer who had been tasked with surveying and constructing airfields for the southern portion of the Trans-African air route.  In 1924, after an interval securing permissions in England, Stella and Chaplin Court Treatt, together with Stella's brother, Errol Hinds, and several others, undertook a seventeen-month car journey from Cape Town to Cairo.  In 1926, the Treatts traveled to Anglo-Egyptian Sudan, to film a wildlife documentary.  Stella Maud Treatt and Chaplin Court Treatt divorced after several trips together, evidently having had enough of each other's company.   In 1937, Stella married Robert "Bob" Mosley Yeo, a doctor who had been treating her in South Africa, and they moved to India.  Stella eventually returned to South Africa with Robert Yeo.  Stella Maud Mosley Yeo died in Johannesburg on 20 December 1976.

Cape to Cairo Expedition

The Court Treatt expedition was the first successful attempt to drive a motor car from Cape Town ("the Cape"), South Africa, to Cairo, Egypt.   The party consisted of Stella Court Treatt, Chaplin Court Treat, Thomas A. Glover, a cinematographer, Fred C. Law, special correspondent for the London Daily Express, Stella's brother Errol, Julius Mapata, the expedition's guide and translator, and Captain F.C. Blunt and Mr. McEleavey, representatives of the Crossley Motor company.

On September 13, 1924, they set off from Cape Town in two Crossley 25/30 cars with light truck bodies.
They reached Cairo sixteen months (and 12,732 miles) later on January 24, 1926.  The expedition was explicitly modeled after the fashion of Cecil Rhodes' "red line" connecting the Cape Town to Cairo, and they restricted their route to territories under British rule.  Fred Law's account of the beginning of the trip, Woman Pioneer of Empire: Cape to Cairo venture Begun (Daily Express, September 24, 1924), began with an invocation of Rhodes' vision of a network of roads and railroads linking up British colonial possessions to afford white settlement and the more effective domination of the continent and its people: "The second step towards the fulfilment of Cecil Rhodes' scheme to open up the routes through darkest Africa began this morning, when Major and Mrs. C. Court Treatt left Capetown in an attempt to reach Cairo by motorcar."  Stella observed the difficulties that the imperial route presented; "[had we taken an alternative route] our problems would have been simplified [. . .] we would have found roads [. . .] and we could have avoided bridgeless rivers and swamps. But the desirability of blazing a trail through British Africa was superior to every other consideration."  Their route took them from Cape Town through Britstown, Pretoria, Polokwane (formerly, Pietersburg), Bulawayo (in Zimbabwe, formerly, Rhodesia, where they visited Cecil Rhode's grave), Livingstone (in Zambia, formerly Northern Rhodesia), Kabwe (in Zambia, formerly called Broken Hill), Mbala (in Zambia and formerly called Abercorn), Karonga (Malawi, formerly Nyasaland), Mwaya (Tanzania, formerly Tanganyika), Nairobi (Kenya), Mongalla (South Sudan, formerly the Anglo-Egyptian Sudan), Rumbek, Wau, Al-Ubayyid (Sudan, formerly the Anglo-Egyptian Sudan; spelled, 'El Obeid,' by Treatt), Ed Dueim, Khartoum, Wadi Halfa, and finally Aswan (Egypt) to Cairo in Egypt.

Southern Sudan
The expedition left Nairobi on October 10, 1925, and reached Mongala eight days later, where they were received by Major Roy Brock, Deputy governor of Mongalla Province.  After declining an offer to transport their cars by steamer to bypass the Sudd, South Sudan's great central wetlands, they set off again on October 25, 1925, with the aim of reaching Terekeka, which lay about 60 miles north.  Their route took them through Rumbek, Tonj, Aweil, and across the Lol River and then the Kiir River and eventually to Muglad and Al-Ubayyid, which they reached on December 20, 1925.  They rarely made more than eight miles per day, frequently needing to rely on people (often hundreds at a time) living along the route to drag and pull and raft or float their cars across rivers and haul them through swamps.

Return to England
When the Treatts returned to England, "their journey was celebrated as a triumph of the British spirit and the superiority of British engineering."  In 1927, not long after their return, Stella published Cape to Cairo: The Record of a Historic Motor Journey and the film of the expedition, Cape to Cairo, was screened in Britain and the United States, "accompanied by lectures and numerous interviews starring the glamorous Stella Court Treatt".  Newspapers and advertisers transformed the Treatts into celebrities, with Crossley Motors and the North British Rubber Company running advertisements alongside interviews with Stella.

The General Strike of 1926, which began three months after their return to England, provided a backdrop for Stella's account of the Treatt expedition.

Stella met King George V and Queen Mary at Buckingham Palace, and her portrait was taken by the London photography firm Bassano Ltd, Royal Photographers.

Sudan Expedition
In 1928, after spending two years in England, the Treatts set out again for Sudan to make a moving picture of Sudan's wildlife.  Their trip began at Port Sudan and continued the length of the railway to El Obeid, taking the Treatts through places like Abu Gabra that they had visited during their earlier Cape-to-Cairo expedition.  Two motion pictures were produced, Stampede (1930) and Stark Nature (1930).

Stampede is a romance scripted by Stella that concerns a man named Boru and how he found love with Loweno and ended up a "Sheikh", after first being orphaned, when his mother was killed by a lion, and adopted by a Habbaniya sheikh, who subsequently loses his life along with his son during a drought, thus opening up the position of sheikh for Boru.  The film is organized around a visual trope of 'primitive Africans' and their close linkages to wildlife.

Stark Nature (1930) was also organized around a visual trope of 'primitive Africans' and 'modern Europeans.'  The film opens with cabaret dancing in London to supply a contrast with African dance.  In Sudan Sand: filming the baggara Arabs (1930) Stella describes building an artificial river to provide a suitable setting for a wildlife film: "there is more forest than we know what to do with.  The real difficulty lies in finding a suitable forest with a natural water course running in the same place."  Much like the narrative of Cape to Cairo (1927), the story of Sudan Sand (1930) revolves around the difficulties that the Treatts encountered in trying to compel colonial subjects to dig a river without compensation or adequate tools or any obvious purpose in the heat of Equatorial Africa.

Stark Nature (1930) received mixed reviews.  Some complained that all the cutting between "primitive and modern" dance sequences was overwrought; others wrote that the narrative was too artificial for a "Nature film."

Published works

Writing

Filmography

See also

Cape to Cairo Road
Cecil Rhodes
All-Red Route
Imperial Airways
Court Treatt expedition
Crossley Motors
List of female explorers and travelers

Notes

References 

1924 in Africa
Female explorers
South African travel writers
South African documentary filmmakers
South African women film directors
Women travel writers
Women documentary filmmakers